Aiman Abdallah (born 1965) is a German television presenter of Egyptian descent for the German television show Galileo at ProSieben and former rugby national player. Born in Bad Kreuznach, he played for the Berliner SV 1892.

Life and career 
From 1984 to 1991, he studied computer science at the TU Berlin. Parallel from 1987 to 1993, he worked as a freelance employee at ZDF. From 1990 to 1993, he worked as a freelance editor for various production companies. Around the same time, he worked as a freelancer in the sports department of the television station RIAS-TV in Berlin. From 1993 to 1994, Abdallah worked as a sports editor for the international broadcaster Deutsche Welle and as a sports presenter for the radio station Kiss-FM in Berlin. In 1995, he moved to n-tv, where he was a sports editor until 1997. Then, Abdallah worked as a sports moderator and announcer at Premiere in Hamburg until 1998.

Aiman Abdallah has lived separately from his wife since 2003 and has three children.

Literature 
 Aiman Abdallah: Physik fängt unter der Dusche an. Den Alltag entdecken mit Galileo, Rowohlt Taschenbuch Verlag, Reinbek 2007,

References

External links 
 
Literature from and about Aiman Abdallah in the German National Library

1965 births
Living people
German Muslims
German television presenters
German sports journalists
German people of Egyptian descent
People from Bad Kreuznach
ProSieben people
Technical University of Berlin alumni
Berliner SV 1892 players